Jorge Castañeda may refer to:
Jorge Castañeda y Álvarez de la Rosa (1921–1997), Mexican foreign secretary 1979–82
Jorge Castañeda Gutman (born 1953), Mexican foreign secretary 2000–03, academic, son of the above
Jorge Castañeda (footballer) (born 1970), Mexican footballer
Jorge Castaneda (boxer) (born 1996), American boxer